4Kings or Four Kings is a professional esports organization once based in the United Kingdom and currently operating in the United States. The team had players competing in Return to Castle Wolfenstein, Enemy Territory: Quake Wars, Quake III, Warcraft III, Unreal Tournament, Counter-Strike, Team Fortress 2 and Shootmania. One of the most famous members of 4Kings is Warcraft III player Grubby. Philip Wride was a manager of the team as well as Jason Potter being general manager.

History 
4Kings was formed as Quake 1 clan playing in the Quake World client.

Under the management of Zommy the clan grew expanding into new games such as Quake III, Warcraft III,  Return to Castle Wolfenstein and Counter-Strike be one of the most recognised esports teams in the world at the time. They retired the team in 2013 until the new owner purchased the team in 2022. The team is currently in the process of building a becoming what it used to be. The new owners is Tyler “4K Kraazy” Knoll and Marc "4K Mediic" Daniel II.

References 

 
1997 establishments in England
2013 disestablishments in England
Esports teams based in England
Defunct and inactive Call of Duty teams
Defunct and inactive Counter-Strike teams
Defunct and inactive FIFA (video game series) teams
Defunct and inactive League of Legends teams
Quake teams
Warcraft III teams
World of Warcraft teams
Esports teams established in 1997
Esports teams disestablished in 2013